Nicholas or Nick Dean may refer to:

Nick Dean (singer), American singer on The X Factor
Nick Dean (Paralympic administrator) (born 1952), Australian sport administrator and wine industry consultant
List of Jimmy Neutron characters#Nick Dean
Nicholas Dean (diplomat), United States Ambassador to Bangladesh
Nicholas Dean (author), winner of a John Lyman Book Award